Barbara Kay Olson (née Bracher; December 27, 1955September 11, 2001) was an American lawyer and conservative television commentator who worked for CNN, Fox News Channel, and several other outlets. She was a passenger on American Airlines Flight 77 en route to a taping of Bill Maher's television show Politically Incorrect when it was flown into the Pentagon in the September 11 attacks.

Early life
Olson was born Barbara Kay Bracher in Houston, Texas, on December 27, 1955. Her older sister, Toni Bracher-Lawrence, was a member of the Houston City Council from 2004 to 2010. She graduated from Waltrip High School.

Personal life
She married Theodore Olson in 1996, becoming his third wife.

Olson was a frequent critic of the Bill Clinton administration and wrote a book about then First Lady Hillary Clinton, Hell to Pay: The Unfolding Story of Hillary Rodham Clinton (1999). Olson's second book, The Final Days: The Last, Desperate Abuses of Power by the Clinton White House was published posthumously.

Death and legacy

Olson was a passenger on American Airlines Flight 77, on her way to a taping of Politically Incorrect in Los Angeles, when it was flown into the Pentagon in the September 11 attacks.

Her original plan had been to fly to California on September 10, but she waited until the next day so that she could wake up with her husband on his birthday, September 11. At the National September 11 Memorial, Olson's name is located on Panel S-70 of the South Pool, along with those of other passengers of Flight 77.

Three months after the attacks, Olson's remains were identified. She was buried at her family's retreat in Wisconsin.

Books

References

External links

 
 
 
 
 Wife of Solicitor General alerted him of hijacking from plane
 Barbara Olson Mourned at Arlington Service
 Barbara Olson: A Sparkling Celebrity 'Full of Energy' Newsday.com-Victims Search
 Alfred S. Regnery (September 17, 2001). "Barbara Olson, RIP". Human Events/BNet Research Center.

1955 births
2001 deaths
20th-century American lawyers
20th-century American non-fiction writers
20th-century American women lawyers
20th-century American women writers
21st-century American lawyers
21st-century American non-fiction writers
21st-century American women lawyers
21st-century American women writers
American Airlines Flight 77
American political commentators
American political writers
American women television personalities
American terrorism victims
Benjamin N. Cardozo School of Law alumni
Lawyers from Washington, D.C.
People from Houston
People murdered in Virginia
Terrorism deaths in Virginia
University of St. Thomas (Texas) alumni
Victims of aviation accidents or incidents in the United States
Victims of the September 11 attacks
Washington, D.C., Republicans
Wilmer Cutler Pickering Hale and Dorr associates
Television personalities from Texas